The Frauen DFB-Pokal 2000–01 was the 21st season of the cup competition, Germany's second-most important title in women's football. The first round of the competition was held on 19–20 August 2000. In the final which was held in Berlin on 26 May 2001 FFC Frankfurt defeated Flaesheim-Hillen 2–1, thus claiming their third title, all consecutive. On their road to the final all games of Flaesheim-Hillen except the first had to be decided by a penalty shootout.

1st round

2nd round

Quarter-finals

Semi-finals

Final

DFB-Pokal Frauen seasons
Pokal
Fra